Michonne (full name in the comic book series: Michonne Hawthorne) is a fictional character from  The Walking Dead. The character also appears in media adaptations of the series, most notably the television series of the same name, in which she is portrayed by Danai Gurira. Armed with a katana and harboring a mysterious past, Michonne is introduced clothed under a hood and pulling the shackles of two reanimated corpses for protection and camouflage.  The two walkers are subsequently revealed to be her zombified boyfriend and his best friend. In both the comic and TV series, she has a prominent role in the conflict between the town of Woodbury led by The Governor, and the Prison group.

The direction of the character is contrasted between the two mediums (though in both mediums, Michonne is introduced as an outsider who quickly proves to be a valuable asset). In the comic, Michonne is a former lawyer as well as a divorcée with two missing daughters. She forms a casual relationship with Tyreese while he is already in a relationship with Carol Peletier. Her conflict with The Governor is much more violent in the comics, enduring sexual assault before mutilating him in revenge. Michonne's mental state deteriorates after many losses, bringing her closer to Rick Grimes, who shares similar trauma. Despite finding temporary peace with Ezekiel at The Kingdom, Michonne runs away to Oceanside before making a return. Her absence was explored in a 3-episode mini-series by Telltale Games, exploring her departure and living life at sea.

Michonne's backstory is slightly altered in the television series, having a three-year-old son named André Anthony, while the fate of her boyfriend and friend remain the same. In the television series, Michonne's trauma and guarded nature gradually diminishes as she slowly recovers and finds herself opening up and investing in a community of Rick's core group. Her conflict with The Governor is motivated by his attempt to kill her after leaving the town under suspicion that he is dangerous and trying to protect her friend Andrea. In addition, her relationship with the Grimes family is explored in more depth as she pushes her group to strive for a sanctuary in Washington, DC. She also develops a romance with protagonist Rick Grimes, becoming a surrogate mother to his children, Carl and Judith. In the six years following Rick's disappearance and apparent death, she becomes one of the leaders of the Alexandria Safe-Zone, and has given birth to Rick's son Rick Jr. (RJ), before leaving to find the imprisoned Rick upon learning of his survival and abduction by the Civic Republic Military (CRM).

The character has been critically praised, often regarded as a fan-favorite in both mediums. Michonne was voted #86 on IGN's Top 100 Comic Book Heroes and Gurira's performance has been well received.

Appearances

Comic book series

Early storylines (2005–2008)
Michonne is introduced as a mysterious woman armed with a katana. She first appears towing two armless, jawless zombies in shackles and causes no small consternation among the group. She saves Otis from zombies and follows him to the abandoned prison where the group is based. She immediately bonds with Tyreese, recognizing him from his days in the NFL, and shares his passion for weightlifting. They sleep together, precipitating Tyreese's breakup with Carol Peletier; Michonne and Tyreese then become a couple.

Michonne reveals some details of her life before the apocalypse. She was a lawyer who had recently ended her marriage and lost custody of her children. At first, she appears to have suffered some kind of trauma or mental illness, often carrying on conversations with herself or with her deceased boyfriend, as Andrea first notices in the prison. Michonne later admits to Rick Grimes that she has imaginary conversations with her dead boyfriend to keep herself from breaking down, and as a coping mechanism to deal with the real world's horrors. In return, Rick shows her a rotary telephone he uses to "call" his late wife, Lori.

Michonne is among the small group sent out to investigate a helicopter crash, and they stumble upon the town of Woodbury. Woodbury's Governor betrays and captures them, and violently rapes and tortures Michonne. He soon realizes she must be dealt with more aggressively when she kills all the participants in a gladiator-style tournament. The group escapes, but Michonne remains behind, saying "she has to take care of some things". She tortures, sodomizes, and mutilates the Governor before making her way back to the prison with the rest of the group. When the Governor retaliates, Michonne and Tyreese go on the offensive, attempting guerrilla warfare in order to buy the prison time to prepare for the next attack. Instead Michonne is forced to flee after nearly being captured, and Tyreese is captured and used as a bargaining tool to get into the prison. When this fails, the Governor kills Tyreese with Michonne's katana. Moments later, she returns and reclaims her sword, disappearing into the woods nearby.

Post-prison (2008–2010)
After the events at the prison, she returns to look for the RV survivors and puts Tyreese's reanimated remains to peace.  When she finds only footprints, she begins to follow them and stumbles upon Rick and his son, Carl.  She saves Carl from a zombie and joins up with Rick and Carl. Michonne protects Carl as a mother would, and goes to great lengths to protect Rick out of respect for him. She bonds with them and keeps Rick's "conversations" with Lori secret. They rejoin other surviving members of the group at Hershel Greene's farm. Michonne travels with the survivors in search of safety, and inquires about Morgan Jones' whereabouts. When Rick asks if she finds Morgan attractive, Michonne admits that she does, but is still mourning Tyreese.

Alexandria (2010–2012)
When the survivors locate the town of Alexandria, a safe haven from the undead, and think they have finally been given an opportunity to rest, Michonne has a difficult time relinquishing her sword, as seen with her confrontation with Alexandria resident Douglas. Another resident, Olivia, persuades Douglas to allow Michonne to keep her weapon. Michonne settles into her new "home" and even hangs her sword above the mantle. She recalls all of the horrific ways she has used it to survive, and finally proclaims, "I am through with you." Michonne begins to let her guard down, and Rick asks Douglas if there is a job for her in the community. Since there is no need for lawyers, Douglas recommends making her a constable to uphold the law in Alexandria.

Michonne attends a welcome party held by Douglas in honor of Alexandria's new residents, but is quiet and reserved during the festivities. When one of Alexandria's residents, Barbara, tries playing matchmaker between Michonne and a young man named Heath, Michonne wearies of the conversation among the partygoers and attempts to leave. Barbara makes a well-intentioned attempt to dissuade her, but becomes insistent about what Michonne would care to eat and says she would hate to cook a meal Michonne did not enjoy. Michonne snaps and asks if that is all she truly concerns herself about. The guests grow silent.  Michonne, uncomfortable, leaves. She finds Morgan, who confesses to having left the party earlier, and they commiserate about not caring for "chipper" people. Michonne admits their conversation made her feel even more alone. She lets her guard down and rests her head on Morgan's shoulder. They end up having sex that night, but Michonne is annoyed and turned off by Morgan's refusal to let go of his deceased wife.

Michonne ends up falling for Morgan. The two ultimately get a chance to make up afterwards, agreeing to take things slow and get to know each other better. She is devastated when he is bitten by a zombie, amputating his arm in an attempt to save his life. Michonne later apologizes to a seemingly-unconscious Morgan. She says she does not mean to be insensitive and asks for his forgiveness, only to realize he has already died.

The group successfully fends off an attack when Alexandria is swarmed by zombies, later holding funerals for Morgan and other fallen friends. Rick finds Michonne sitting at Morgan's grave, and she says she would have lived with Morgan for the rest of her life. She then says she doubts that she will ever be happy. Michonne helps in clearing up the last of the zombie horde in Alexandria and Rick approaches her, asking how she feels. Michonne replies that she is getting by, and thinks it's nice someone cares about her.

War against Negan (2012–2014)
Michonne and Abraham are clearing zombies away from the Alexandria Safe-Zone perimeter when they are surprised by an unknown man, later revealed to be named Paul "Jesus" Monroe. Jesus reveals he has traveled from a community nearby and wishes to establish an alliance between them all. Rick lashes out at Jesus, knocking him unconscious, and Michonne helps in tying him up. Rick, Michonne, and Abraham set out to scout the area for an impending threat, but realize Jesus was telling the truth, and Rick decides to work with him. Rick, Michonne, Jesus, Glenn, Carl and Andrea travel to Jesus' community, the "Hilltop". Along the way, Paul helps the group defeat walkers even with his hands tied, proving his trustworthiness.

Once inside Hilltop, the group learns that Hilltop's leader, Gregory, has established a deal with Negan, the brutal leader of a group of bandits known as "The Saviors". The Saviors keep the area clear of the dead in exchange for half of everything the Hilltop survivors manage to gather. However, the Saviors have been abusing members of the Hilltop Colony and Rick volunteers to help deal with Negan, a decision Michonne seems angry about. The group is attacked by a group of Saviors on their way back to Alexandria, but Rick's group emerges victorious and kills all but one of them. Rick spares him so he can deliver a message to Negan, saying they are protecting Hilltop now and want half of Negan's supplies.

The Saviors kill Abraham and capture Eugene, sparking a conflict between Alexandria and the Saviors. Michonne travels with Rick, Carl, Glenn, Maggie and Sophia to Hilltop, but they are captured by Negan along the way. Negan savagely bashes Glenn's head in with a baseball bat and leaves the other survivors, saying they will be back to collect half of Alexandria's supplies. Michonne and the others return to Alexandria, to find a battle has taken place between the Safe Zone and the Saviors, resulting in Rick's group capturing one of Negan's men. Rick lets the man go free, but Carl disappears sometime later, and Michonne joins Rick, Andrea, and Jesus on a trip to Negan's community, suspecting the Saviors have kidnapped Carl. After a brief scuffle between Negan and Rick, it is revealed Carl is safe and they return to Alexandria.

Michonne tries unsuccessfully to seduce Heath, who reveals Maggie told him about what happened between Michonne and Tyreese. She leaves and asks Heath to pretend as if the moment had never happened. Michonne and Carl are later seen fighting a group of walkers, and Carl is surprised by one of them, which falls on top of him. Carl says he is useless with only one eye, but Michonne assures him Rick is fine with only one hand. Michonne later tells Andrea that she feels as if she cannot talk normally to anyone anymore, including Heath.

Michonne, Rick and several others travel to a community known as "The Kingdom" where Rick plans to get help from Ezekiel to defeat Negan. She and Ezekiel become romantically involved, despite starting off on the wrong foot. Michonne participates in the war against Negan and the Saviors, which ends in Rick's group emerging victorious and imprisoning Negan.

Disappearance and The Walking Dead: Michonne (2014–2016)
After the war, there is a time-skip. Michonne is not seen for a long period of time. Rick states that he still misses her "even after all this time." Michonne's disappearance is explained in the video game.

Whisperers arc (2015–2017)
Michonne is first revealed stepping off of a sailboat. She immediately shows her negative feelings toward Ezekiel by asking herself, "Seriously, there was no one else he (Rick) could have sent?" As Rick asks many questions as to why Michonne had left Ezekiel and the Kingdom, she reveals that she abandoned her daughters during the outbreak and that she would never be able to start a new life with all of her regret. The conversation ends with Rick telling her to "get her shit together" and to "go back home."

Rick and Michonne discover the decapitated heads of Ezekiel and Rosita on pikes, and Michonne is devastated by her lover's death. They later find out that someone helped Negan escape from his cell. Michonne initially desires to go back to sailing with Pete, but Rick encourages her to become the Kingdom's new leader, since Eziekiel was killed. Despite having defeated Negan, Rick's group becomes involved in another war with a group known as the "Whisperers". Michonne and her allies eventually come out on top, but Alexandria is swarmed by an incredibly large herd of walkers. The survivors are able to drive the walkers from Alexandria, but Andrea is bitten on the neck and dies. Michonne and Maggie are seen taking her body away, as the group mourns their losses and rebuild. Rick decides to form a careful alliance with Negan, as he appears to have changed his ways.

The Commonwealth (2018)
Michonne eventually ends up at a seemingly-utopian community known as the Commonwealth, where she is reunited with one of her daughters, Elodie, who she thought had died long ago. Given an offer to join the community and go back to her old job as a lawyer, Michonne gives Eugene her sword and sends him back to Rick as a way of saying she is ready for a new life. However, she returns to action one last time to prevent Elodie from participating in the violent uprising against Commonwealth governor Pamela Milton and keep her safe from an invading swarm of Walkers.

Final issue (2019)
Michonne's last appearance comes in the final issue of the comic series, decades after the tragic murder of Rick. By this point, societies around the world have been restored significantly and walkers are now the oddity rather than the majority. An adult Carl is tried before Michonne, now a High Court judge in the Commonwealth, for the crime of killing walkers Hershel Rhee kept as a travelling show feature, as they are now viewed as property. Michonne determines Carl not guilty, ensuring a peaceful resolution for Carl and his family.

Television series

Season 2 

Michonne makes her first appearance as a hooded figure near the end of the second-season finale, "Beside the Dying Fire" (though at the time Danai Gurira had not been cast for this role), wherein she saves Andrea from a walker by decapitating it with her katana, which features a triquetra on the inner crossguard.

As in the comics, she is accompanied by two chained walkers, side by side with their arms and lower jaws removed to prevent them from attacking. In removing their ability to eat, Michonne effectively tamed these walkers. Michonne has demonstrated economic uses for her pet walkers, such as using them as human pack mules by loading supplies onto their backs as well as a camouflage/repellent, as their presence and scent fools other walkers into thinking those accompanying them are also walkers. Michonne later decapitates the walkers shortly before she and Andrea are discovered by Merle.

Season 3 

In the episode "Walk with Me", Michonne and Andrea are taken by a group led by Merle Dixon (Michael Rooker) from a nearby town called Woodbury, run by the Governor (David Morrissey). Andrea, having been severely ill after spending eight months on the road, embraces the town's sense of community which Michonne resists, suspicious of The Governor and his leadership. In the episode "Say the Word", Michonne ultimately decides to leave alone after failing to convince Andrea to leave. In the episode "Hounded", Michonne's suspicions of The Governor's true nature prove to be true as Merle and his men go after her under the orders of killing her. However, Michonne kills two of Merle's men and escapes. She then spies Maggie (Lauren Cohan) and Glenn (Steven Yeun) on a supply run in a nearby town and overhears directions to the prison where they are staying, but Michonne is not able to make contact with them as they are ambushed and kidnapped by Merle. A wounded and weakened Michonne soon arrives at the prison with Maggie and Glenn's basket of infant supplies. In the episode "When the Dead Come Knocking", Michonne is brought into the prison, albeit cautiously, by Carl (Chandler Riggs) and Rick (Andrew Lincoln), who directs Hershel (Scott Wilson) to tend to her wounds. Michonne informs them of Glenn and Maggie's abduction by Merle, of the Governor, and of Woodbury. In the mid-season finale "Made to Suffer", she accompanies Rick, Daryl (Norman Reedus), unaware he is Merle's brother, and Oscar (Vincent M. Ward) to rescue Glenn and Maggie from Woodbury. In the process, Daryl is kidnapped. After Glenn and Maggie are rescued, Michonne breaks off from the larger group and proceeds to discover the Governor's zombie-head aquaria and reanimated daughter, Penny, whom she kills despite his pleas not to. She and the Governor get into a hand-to-hand fight, which she wins, stabbing him in the eye during the scuffle. Andrea's arrival and intervention at gunpoint prevents Michonne from killing the Governor, and Michonne instead withdraws. When Michonne returns to Rick's group, they question her reliability after her disappearance, but she counters that they need her due to the loss of Daryl.

In the mid-season premiere "The Suicide King", Rick continues to show distrust toward Michonne, and tells her that she will be sent away when she is fully recovered. In the episode "Home", Michonne observes Rick as he hallucinates an encounter with his recently deceased wife, Lori (Sarah Wayne Callies). When the Governor and his men attack the prison, Michonne helps defend it. In the episode "I Ain't a Judas", when Andrea comes to the prison to start a negotiation with them, Michonne tells her The Governor sent Merle to kill her, demonstrating that he won't allow anyone to leave (or live) who isn't under his control. In the episode "Clear", Rick has her join him and Carl on a weapons run to Rick's hometown, where she bonds with the two and eventually earns their trust (Rick confirms to her that she is "one of us"). She confides in him about his hallucinations and tells him she used to speak to her dead boyfriend. In the episode "This Sorrowful Life", Rick reveals to Merle that the Governor claimed he would leave the prison group alone if they handed over Michonne. Merle takes it upon himself to capture her and deliver her to the Governor, but as they talk in the car he has second thoughts and releases her; he instead ambushes the Governor's group alone and kills a number of them before the Governor finds him and kills him. In the season finale "Welcome to the Tombs", following another attack on the prison Rick, accompanied by Michonne and Daryl, sets out to locate the Governor. However, they come across the scene where the Governor slaughtered his own troops. One survivor (Karen) (Melissa Ponzio) leads the group back to Woodbury to locate Andrea, as they fear the worst for her safety after learning she had fled Woodbury for the prison, but never arrived there. They manage to find Andrea but not before she has been bitten by the reanimated Milton (Dallas Roberts), whom she managed to kill. Michonne offers to stay with her in her last minutes before killing herself to prevent reanimation, using a pistol borrowed from Rick. While Michonne is with Andrea in the room, the others outside the room hear a gunshot offscreen. Michonne is seen with Woodbury's remaining citizens and the rest of the group returning to the prison, as they also bring Andrea's corpse back to bury it.

Season 4 

In the season premiere "30 Days Without an Accident", Michonne comes back to the prison from her tireless search for the Governor which has proved unsuccessful. By this point, Michonne seems to have dropped her guard significantly while staying at the prison, as she is shown joking with Rick and Carl. In the episode "Infected", Michonne is about to head back out on her search, but tries to get back in when a walker attack is announced and she injures her ankle. Beth (Emily Kinney) tends to her wounds, and asks her to watch Rick's baby Judith; when Beth leaves the room, Michonne breaks down crying as she cradles the baby. In the episode "Isolation", she volunteers to go with Bob (Lawrence Gilliard Jr.) and Daryl to get antibiotics from a veterinary college to treat a deadly illness that has broken out among the prison population, and Tyreese (Chad Coleman) joins them before they leave. On the car radio they hear a message offering sanctuary at a place called Terminus before the car is swarmed by walkers and they are forced to flee on foot. In the episode "Indifference", they obtain the needed medicine from the college. Daryl and Tyreese argue with Michonne that the Governor won't be found, and that she is more needed at the prison, and she ultimately agrees to give up her search. In the episode "Internment", they return to the prison with the medicine after Rick and Carl have defended the prison from a walker herd. Michonne takes the bodies to be burnt offsite and Hershel decides to go with her. In the episode "Dead Weight", Michonne and Hershel are seen chatting and laughing in the distance as they prepare the bodies for disposal, unaware they are being watched by The Governor who aims his gun at them. In the mid-season finale "Too Far Gone", the Governor kidnaps Hershel and Michonne and convinces his new group to use them as hostages to take over the prison. At the prison, the Governor takes a well-armed caravan with a tank and demands that Rick order his group to leave the prison, using Hershel and Michonne as leverage. Rick tries to reason with the Governor with the offer of living together peacefully but The Governor declares him a liar and decapitates Hershel with Michonne's katana. Rick's group opens fire, and Michonne rolls away and unties herself. The Governor orders his group to kill everyone at the prison, and they attack, breaking down the fences with their vehicles. When the Governor is punching Rick in the face, Michonne impales him through the chest with her katana and escapes as the prison is overwhelmed by walkers drawn by the noise. In all of the confusion, the surviving members of the group have become separated from each other, and Rick and Carl believe the baby Judith has been devoured by walkers. They leave without Michonne, and Glenn is also unaware that she is still there.

In the mid-season premiere "After", Michonne returns to the prison, where she discovers Hershel's reanimated head. After putting her katana through his head as a mercy kill, she takes two new walker pets and travels through the woods. While sleeping, she has a nightmare about her former life. The nightmare reveals that Michonne lived a comfortable life with her boyfriend Mike and her young son Andre before the apocalypse.  While walking through the forest, she encounters a walker that looks disturbingly similar to her. Realizing the walkers will not attack her because they think she is already dead, Michonne chooses to embrace life instead and cuts down the entire herd of walkers. Following this, she has an emotional breakdown and has a brief monologue addressing Mike.  Later in the episode she investigates footprints belonging to Rick and Carl and follows them to a house that they have taken shelter in, crying when she sees them. In the episode "Claimed", Michonne joins Carl on a run for more supplies in the neighborhood and reveals more about her past in an effort to cheer him up. She reveals she had a three-year-old son named Andre Anthony who died shortly after the outbreak began. Rick, Carl and Michonne are forced to travel in the direction of a camp known as Terminus because a group of men intrude on their house. In the episode "Us", Michonne, Rick, and Carl are following a set of train tracks, and it is revealed that the group of men have been tracking them. In the season finale "A", Michonne, Rick and Carl are nearing Terminus. In the night they are ambushed by the group of marauders and held at gunpoint. Daryl, who is travelling with the marauders, attempts to reason with the leader – Joe (Jeff Kober), to no avail. Joe orders his gang to beat Daryl to death, before telling Rick his group will rape Michonne and Carl before assassinating him. Enraged when Dan (Keith Brooks) tries to rape Carl, Rick snaps and brutally kills Joe by biting out a chunk of his throat. In the following confusion, Michonne manages to get hold of a gun and kill two marauders. With the marauders dead, the reunited gang continue to Terminus.

On the outskirts of Terminus, Michonne confesses to Carl the details of Andre's death and the reasoning behind keeping two walker pets. Michonne reveals that she, her boyfriend Mike, his friend Terry, and her son Andre were part of a larger group when the outbreak first started. However, one day while Michonne was out scavenging for supplies for the group, Mike and Terry were getting high while looking after Andre. The group was attacked by a herd of walkers, resulting in Mike and Terry being bitten and Andre being killed. When Michonne returned and realized what happened, she let them turn and kept Mike and Terry as her walker pets, as a way of punishing them for allowing Andre to die. Michonne admits to Carl that she no longer wants to be that kind of person.

Upon entering Terminus and realizing it is a trap, Michonne along with Rick, Carl and Daryl flee across the grounds, to eventually become captured. Forced into a container, the group are reunited with Glenn, Maggie, Bob and Sasha, as well as meeting Sergeant Abraham Ford, Dr. Eugene Porter, Rosita Espinosa and Tara Chambler. Michonne is present as the season closes with Rick uttering the words: "...they're screwing with the wrong people."

Season 5 

In the season five premiere "No Sanctuary" Michonne and the others are able to escape Terminus and are reunited with Carol (Melissa McBride), Tyreese and Judith. In the episode "Strangers", as the group continues travelling Michonne offers to take out a nearby walker only to realize her sword was left behind in Terminus and kills it with a gun instead. As they travel they encounter Fr. Gabriel Stokes (Seth Gilliam) whom they distrust but he gives them shelter in his church. Abraham tries to insist they travel to Washington D.C. where they can cure the outbreak, but Michonne insists to him they find supplies first. Later Gabriel leads Rick, Michonne, Bob and Sasha to a store to find supplies where Michonne reveals the sword was not hers to begin with but she found it and confesses to missing Andrea and Hershel but not the sword. In the episode "Four Walls and a Roof", the group takes shelter in the church while being hunted by the last of the cannibalistic members of Terminus. Rick's group gains the upper hand and Michonne helps in killing Gareth and the others. She discovers the Terminus group has been keeping her katana, which she takes back. In the episode "Crossed", the group learns Beth is still alive and being held captive in a hospital in Atlanta, so Rick leads a team to rescue her, leaving Michonne, Carl and Judith at the church. In the mid-season finale "Coda", Michonne helps defend against a herd of walkers that attack but the church is quickly overrun. They are saved by the timely arrival of Glenn, Maggie, Abraham and the others, and decide to help Rick in Atlanta. Upon arrival at the hospital, Michonne and the others witness Daryl carrying Beth's corpse out of the building, leaving Maggie devastated.

In the midseason premiere "What Happened and What's Going On", Michonne pushes the idea of going to Washington, D.C. despite Noah's (Tyler James Williams) community being overrun in Richmond, Virginia. Later, Tyreese is bitten and Michonne is forced to amputate his arm, but he dies of blood loss anyway. In the episode "Them", Michonne shows concern for Sasha telling her not to give in to anger like Tyreese over her recent losses, but Sasha then breaks formation in silently pushing away walkers by attacking them. Sasha walks off irritated. The group trudge on sixty miles to DC, as they face a tornado in the process. In the episode "The Distance", Maggie and Sasha introduce Aaron (Ross Marquand) to the group, who reveals himself as a recruiter for a safe haven, Alexandria, and takes them there despite going a dangerous route because of their previous mistrusting of communities like Terminus and Woodbury.), they are hesitant to trust him because of what happened in Woodbury and Terminus. Rick initially decides not to take the risk, prompting Michonne to step in and challenge his decision. She argues that the group should give Aaron a chance for the sake of survival, successfully convincing Rick to change his mind. The group arrives at the gates of Alexandria the next day. Rick hears children laughing inside the community's walls, and Michonne smiles, knowing they have made the right decision.

In the episode "Remember", Rick's group has difficulty assimilating into the daily routines of the Alexandria residents. The people of Alexandria, led by politician Deanna Monroe (Tovah Feldshuh), have been shielded from many of the dangers and tribulations that the new world holds, which causes Rick's group to believe they are weak. Deanna asks Rick and Michonne to become the town constables, and they both accept their new roles. In the episode "Forget", Michonne has traded in her usual clothes for a police uniform. Deanna explains to Rick and Michonne that their basic roles as constables are to keep the peace and establish a sense of civilization inside the walls of Alexandria. Deanna invites the entire group to a welcoming party at her house, and Michonne reluctantly attends. Abraham finds her outside by herself, and the two have a discussion about adjusting to their new lives. Michonne is later seen hanging her sword on the fireplace mantle of one of Alexandria's houses, although she doesn't appear happy about doing so.

In the episode "Try", Rosita tells Michonne that Sasha has gone missing from her post in the tower. Worried, they venture outside the walls to look for her. They find several dead walkers and realize Sasha is actively hunting them. They track her down and help her eliminate a large pack of walkers, which leads to an outburst from Sasha. Later, when Rick and Pete fight in the street, Rick begins ranting to the gathered crowd and pointing a gun at them, and Michonne eventually silences him by knocking him unconscious. In the season finale "Conquer", Rick admits to Michonne that he and Carol stole guns from the armory and tries to return the gun, though Michonne says she would not have stopped him, and that she knocked out Rick to protect him, not Alexandria. She also tells Rick she is confident that they can find a way to integrate with Alexandria, but she will still follow him even if they cannot. At the town forum, Michonne is one of the people who speak in Rick's defense then witnesses Rick arrive with a dead walker, who got in because Gabriel left the gate open, and addresses Alexandria itself and how they aren't ready to survive but they have to be and he'll show them how. Pete arrives, drunk and angered, during the meeting with Michonne's katana, bent on assassinating Rick, and Michonne witnesses him killing Reg, Rick killing Pete and Morgan's arrival. Michonne is later seen contemplating mounting her katana back on the wall, but ultimately decides to carry it.

Season 6 

Season 6 finds Rick, Michonne and the others struggling to keep the Alexandria members safe while also teaching them how to survive. In the season premiere "First Time Again", the group discovers an enormous herd of roamers trapped inside a quarry not far from Alexandria. They decide to use the herd as a learning opportunity and also eliminate the threat before it becomes a problem later. While trying to draw the herd away from the walls, Michonne, Rick, Morgan and a few others hear a horn sounding from Alexandria. The noise draws the attention of the walkers and the herd begins heading toward the walls. Morgan is sent ahead of the others to find out what is causing the noise. Rick decides to split up to draw more walkers in another direction, giving Michonne and Glenn the task of ensuring they get the others back to Alexandria and find out what is going on. In the episode "Thank You", Michonne, Glenn, and Heath struggle to stay ahead of the herd and keep the others alive. Glenn gets separated from the group and only Michonne and Heath return to Alexandria alive. In the episode "Now", Michonne informs Maggie she isn't sure what happened to Glenn, but that he would send up a signal if he was alive. Rick returns to Alexandria as well, but has been followed by the herd, and barely makes it back inside Alexandria's walls as Michonne helps close the gates. With walkers gathered outside the walls, the group must decide how to address the problem while waiting for Glenn, Daryl, Sasha and Abraham to return. Rick and Michonne learn more about what happened when the Wolves attacked, and Carol informs them that Morgan allowed several of the Wolves to escape (later killed by Rick). In the episode "Heads Up", Morgan maintains his belief that "all life is precious", and Michonne argues that life is not as simple as four words anymore.

In the mid-season finale episode "Start to Finish", the herd finally breaks through Alexandra's walls after knocking over the guard tower. Michonne, Rick, and Deanna flee towards the houses, but Deanna gets knocked over and falls onto a saw blade, causing a mortal wound to her side. Rick, Michonne, Deanna, Gabriel, Jessie, Carl, and others manage to get inside a house and struggle to keep the walkers from breaking in. Michonne tends to Deanna's wound, only to discover a walker bite on her side. Realizing her end is near, Deanna and Michonne bond while waiting out the herd. Michonne affirms her belief that the new plans Deanna drew up for Alexandria can still work, and Deanna encourages Michonne to find her own answer for what survival means for her. Michonne admits she isn't sure, but later promises she will figure it out. The walkers eventually break into the house and the group is forced to move quickly and leave the dying Deanna. Michonne spends a few last minutes with her, offering to put her down before she turns, but Deanna insists on ending her own life with a gun. Deanna tells her to "give them hell" and Michonne leaves. Rick devises a plan for the group to cover themselves in guts from two walkers they have killed, which allows them to move outside the house undetected by the dead. However, Jessie's son, frightened by the situation, begins calling out to his mother as the group joins hands and moves through the herd.

In the midseason premiere, Jessie and her sons are devoured by the walkers. Michonne is forced to stab Ron, who shoots Carl in the eye. Rick and Michonne get Carl to the infirmary and help the surviving residents drive the herd out of Alexandria. Two months later, Alexandria is being rebuilt and things have more or less returned to normal. After sharing a sincere moment with Carl, Michonne realizes what she desires in her life. That night, she and Rick kiss and have sex, beginning a romantic relationship. However, Rick's group soon becomes involved in a conflict with Negan, who captures most of the survivors and kills one of them with "Lucille" a bat wrapped in barbed wire.

Season 7 

In the season premiere, "The Day Will Come When You Won't Be", Michonne witnesses the deaths of group members Abraham and Glenn. She is later held at gunpoint, along with the rest of the group, as Negan commands Rick to chop off Carl's left arm to remove the last of Rick's disobedience. Michonne tells Negan that they now understand, but Negan tells her that its Rick who doesn't understand. As Rick starts to comply, Negan stops Rick as it was all a test to break his will, which is successful. Sasha then helps get Maggie to the doctor at the Hilltop after Negan and his people leave. Michonne goes with Rick and the others in the RV. In "Service", Michonne is shown walking outside Alexandria with a rifle she concealed in the house before the Saviors arrive. She is shown practicing her marksmanship by shooting at a walker with the rifle to prepare for the fight she feels is coming. When she returns, Rick states he needs the rifle as the Saviors want all their guns. Michonne doesn't want her community to surrender their guns, but eventually hands it over. Rick later tells her about his old partner and friend being Judith's real father, and that he had to accept it in order to raise her and keep her alive as his own daughter. Stating that this is their life now and he had to accept it as she does. Michonne later reappears in "Sing Me a Song", where she is shown walking along whistling to lure walkers. She then kills them and drags their bodies over to a pile. This causes a female Savior to stop driving and observe the pile, allowing Michonne to take her hostage and demand that she take her to Negan. The following episode, "Hearts Still Beating", shows Michonne attempting to talk to the Savior, who remains silent. They arrive outside the Sanctuary and Michonne realizes the power and scope of the Saviors. She later returns to find the Saviors killed Spencer and Olivia and took Eugene hostage. She finds Rick in the jail cell Morgan built and attempts to convince him that they're fighters and that, despite Negan's power, they can find a way to win. Rick agrees, having seen the costs of subjugation and the two reunite with Maggie and Daryl at the Hilltop (along with Carl, Rosita, and Tara) as the group walks off to plan their next move. In "Rock in the Road", Michonne is part of the group that sets out with Rick and Jesus to the Kingdom to enlist their help. When this fails, they come across wired explosives, placed by the Saviors, to deter walker herds. Michonne aids Rick in stealing them and tells him that they can win, just to put a smile on his face. The episode ends with the group being captured by an unknown group of survivors which results in Rick smiling at the discovery of a potential ally. In "New Best Friends", Michonne is part of the group that meets with this new group. When Rick is tested by being pitted against an armored walker, Michonne helps advise him on how to kill it. He later thanks her by gifting her a metal cat sculpture he found. In "Say Yes", Michonne goes out scavenging with Rick to find the guns they need. They enjoy their time together and are eventually able to discover a carnival wrought with reanimated soldiers. They stumble upon a large amount of packaged food and discuss their future after the Saviors have been dealt with. The next day, their plans go awry and they are quickly swarmed by walkers. At one point, Rick is seemingly killed and Michonne goes into a catatonic state, nearly allowing herself to be killed before Rick is revealed to be okay and they manage to win. Michonne later confides to Rick that she can't bear the thought of losing him, but agrees that she'll take charge if he dies in the upcoming fight. In "Something They Need", after Tara tells Rick about the arsenal in Oceanside, they take a group of Alexandrians to the distant community. Michonne joins them to acquire weapons and people to win the war against the Saviors. Rick helps Michonne climb a tree and asks if she is good, she replies that she is good enough. When Michonne was about to shoot Natania who had Tara as a hostage, Cyndie manages to neutralize her. Michonne warns Rick that the walkers approach, the group of Rick and the Oceansider work together and eliminate the walkers and the group achieves its objective with those of Oceaneside but an angry Natania agrees to give them the weapons and rejects that their community go to war, late at night the group returns to Alexandria and Rosita opens the door, she takes them to the prison cell, where Dwight is waiting. Rick and Michonne retain Daryl when he wanted to kill him, moments later Dwight reveals that he wants to help them. In the season finale "The First Day of the Rest of Your Life", Rick and his group are betrayed by Jadis and the Scavengers, and it is revealed that Sasha has died and turned into a walker, unknown to Negan. The zombified Sasha attacks Negan but is not successful in killing him. Michonne participates in the ensuing battle, but she is badly hurt and nearly dies. She is later seen resting in bed, with Rick by her side.

Season 8

The eighth season of the series focuses on the ongoing war against Negan and the Saviors, with both sides suffering several losses. Having been injured previously, Michonne does not make many appearances initially, but becomes more involved in the second half of the season. In the midseason premiere, "Honor", she and Rick deal with the aftermath of Carl being bitten by a walker. Michonne is forced to say a tearful goodbye as Carl, close to turning, shoots himself to prevent reanimation. In "The Lost and the Plunderers" she and Rick leave Alexandria after burying Carl and head towards Hilltop, stopping at the Junkyard on the way. Michonne seems shocked to find that all of Jadis’ people have been murdered and is later slightly uncomfortable after Rick decided not to save her. The couple eventually reach hilltop.

Michonne contacts Negan via walkie-talkie and reads Carl's letter addressed to him, attempting to change Negan's mind and end the conflict without bloodshed, a belief that became very important to Michonne by the end of the eighth season. However, Negan insists on killing Rick, and destroys the walkie-talkie. In the final episode, Rick finally fights Negan and wins. Instead of killing him, Rick only cuts his throat and decides to imprison him for his actions, much to the dismay and anger of Maggie. Michonne, however, agrees with Rick's choice.

Season 9

The ninth season of the series finds Rick's group attempting to build new lives following an end to the conflict against the Saviors, with Negan being kept in the jail inside Alexandria. Despite the loss of Carl, Rick and Michonne have moved forward and have concentrated on building a future for the growing Judith. The couple also decides to start trying to conceive a baby together.

The group has started construction on a bridge that will serve to connect Alexandria, the Kingdom, and Hilltop with the Sanctuary, ensuring that all communities are able to stay in contact ("The Bridge"). Rick and the others have learned that the remaining Saviors who still dwell at the Sanctuary are now starving without Negan to lead them. Maggie initially refuses to help them, but ultimately changes her mind. Michonne even suggests that the communities have common laws that everyone follows, and after getting Maggie's input, she begins drafting a charter. However, at the Hilltop, their leader Gregory (Xander Berkely) makes two unsuccessful attempts on Maggie's life. Taking justice into her own hands, Maggie has Daryl hang Gregory for his betrayal, which shocks Michonne and Rick ("A New Beginning").

Despite staying busy throughout the day by overseeing construction in Alexandria and tending to the overall community, Michonne still feels unfulfilled. She then realizes it is because she has not faced any real excitement because she has not dispatched any walkers in a while. Deciding not to tell Rick, she ventures out late every night to fight any walkers that are roaming outside Alexandria's walls. On one such night, she comes across a walker strung up in a tree with his hands tied, which angers her because it reminds her of Gregory's death at the hands of Maggie. Distracted, she is attacked from behind by another walker and is nearly bitten. She grabs a baseball bat nearby and kills the walker, realizing with horror that the bat reminds her of Glenn and Abraham's deaths. After this encounter, she decides to stop sneaking out at night.

Back in Alexandria, Michonne stops Maggie from going into Negan's cell and killing him. Although Maggie wants revenge for him killing her husband Glenn, Michonne tells her that it will only start something else. However, Maggie is insistent, and Michonne steps aside for her to go in. Despite her chance, Maggie realizes Negan is a shadow of his former self, and decides that leaving him to suffer in the cell is better.

In the episode "What Comes After", Rick seemingly sacrifices himself by blowing up the bridge to stop an oncoming herd of walkers, leaving Michonne devastated. Unknown to Michonne and everyone else, Rick actually survives the explosion and is taken away in a helicopter, accompanied by Anne. In the six years following his disappearance, it is revealed that Michonne has assumed leadership over the Alexandria community and was pregnant at the time of Rick's supposed demise; she is now a parent to Rick's daughter Judith (Cailey Fleming), as well as their own child together, Rick Jr. (RJ) Grimes.

It becomes apparent that over the course of those six years, a major rift has formed between Michonne and the other communities. She is hesitant to travel to the Hilltop, expressing concern that Maggie might kill her if she sees her. Also, Tara seems cold toward Michonne when she arrives there. However, it is revealed that Maggie is no longer at Hilltop and has left to go with another group, which Michonne didn't know about.  Carol, now in a relationship with Ezikiel and helping him lead the Kingdom, tries to convince Michonne to allow Alexandria to come back into the fold, but she declines.

At some point, Michonne learns that Negan has escaped from his cell, only to return to it a short time later, by his own free will. Confronting him in the jail, she believes he only returned because he couldn't make it in the new world by himself. Negan counters that he has changed over the years and wants to help Michonne lead Alexandria, an idea she rejects. She also learns that Judith has been talking to Negan in secret. Judith believes that Negan is not a bad person, putting her at odds with Michonne.

Simultaneously, Michonne and the others must deal with a new threat - the Whisperers, a group of people who survive among the walkers by wearing their skin on their faces and imitating the walkers ("Evolution"). Longtime ally Jesus (Tom Payne) is killed when he is caught off-guard and stabbed by a male Whisperer in a cemetery. Daryl kills the man and discovers they all wear walker skin over their faces.

In the episode “Scars”, some of the six-year time lapse is explored in a series of flashbacks. Michonne is shown visibly pregnant, having spent the last few months helping Daryl look for Rick's body after the explosion, finding no trace of him except for his pistol. New survivors turn up at Alexandria's gates, among them Jocelyn (Rutina Wesley), Michonne's friend from her college days. Jocelyn reveals that she has been taking care of a group of children, and encourages Michonne to leave Alexandria. While Michonne is gone, Jocelyn and her group steal supplies and other children from Alexandria, including Judith.

Michonne and Daryl eventually track down Jocelyn, who has them captured, tortured and branded. However, they escape, with Michonne confronting Jocelyn and the children. In the ensuing struggle, Jocelyn beats Michonne with a wooden plank, and one of the children slashes her pregnant belly. Michonne ultimately kills Jocelyn by stabbing her with her sword. When the children attack, she is forced to kill them. However, she is successful in rescuing Judith and they return to Alexandria with Daryl.

The violent incident is shown to have ramifications years later; when Daryl shows up at Alexandria's gates with a wounded Henry and Lydia (Cassady McClincy), daughter of the Whisperers' leader Alpha (Samantha Morton), Michonne and Aaron are initially hesitant to allow Lydia in. However, Michonne decides that she trusts Daryl and allows them in, but only long enough for Henry to get medical attention. She refuses to provide an escort for them as they plan to travel to the Kingdom. Judith decides to sneak away on her own to protect them, taking Rick's pistol with her. Michonne sets out to track down Judith, arriving in time to save her from a group of walkers. They discuss what happened years before with Jocelyn, as Michonne was unaware Judith had seen her slaughter the children and remembered the incident. Judith believes Michonne did the right thing at that time, but that Daryl and the others are still their allies and they should now help them. Michonne decides that Judith is right and they leave together to catch up with Daryl and the others, unaware that they are being watched by two Whisperers.

In "The Calm Before", Michonne brings all the leaders from the communities to meet with Alpha. She apologizes for Alexandria forgoing its relationships, that Alexandria will give asylum to Alpha's daughter, Lydia, and to establish a mutual protection pact knowing that Alpha will likely retaliate. Sure enough, Alpha takes her revenge by killing Henry, Enid, Tara, Ozzy (Angus Sampson), Alek (Jason Kirkpatrick), D.J. (Matt Mangum), Frankie (Elyse Nicole DuFour), Tammy Rose (Brett Butler), and Rodney (Joe Ando Hirsh). Michonne blames herself for their deaths.

In the season finale episode “The Storm”, the group must battle their way through freezing temperatures and walkers, crossing through the Whisperers’ territory in order to make it back to their own communities. The finale takes place a few months after the events of the previous episode, “The Calm Before”, which ended in the deaths of several allies. Michonne and the others eventually make it back to Alexandria, where she is relieved to be reunited with Judith and RJ. She later visits Negan, who is healing in the infirmary. He commends her for crossing through Alpha's territory, despite the danger. Although her issues with Negan are far from repaired, it appears that Michonne realizes he has changed over the years.

Season 10

The tenth season has been confirmed to be Michonne's last on the show, with Gurira exiting after a handful of episodes during the first half of the season.

The tenth season of the series focuses on the group's struggle to survive while under the omnipresent watch of Alpha and the Whisperers. In the midseason finale “The World Before”, Michonne meets a man named Virgil (Kevin Carroll), who may hold a vital position in the war against the Whisperers. Michonne agrees to travel with him by boat to an abandoned island to help him find his family, in exchange for weapons the group can use against Alpha. Michonne leaves her children behind with Daryl, Carol, and the others, sailing away on a boat.

Michonne arrives at the naval base with Virgil but finds no weapons, soon realizing it's a trap; before she is able to leave however, Virgil locks her up, and she finds there are other captives on the island. Virgil then drugs her, and she experiences hallucinogenic visions of Andrea and Siddiq, and what her life would have been had she sided with Negan and the Saviors. As she comes to, she stabs Virgil, escapes, and frees the others. She chases Virgil to a storage room where she finds Rick's boots. Later, on a stranded naval ship, she also finds a phone with Rick's name and a drawing of her and Judith etched into it, suggesting that Rick may still be alive. She allows Virgil to live, takes leave of the others and contacts Judith via walkie-talkie to tell of her intent to find Rick. Taking two new walker pets fastened in chains, Michonne starts on her journey in the wilderness. She later finds two stragglers, a man and woman, who need help catching up to a large group of organized troops marching ahead of them. Thinking back on how Rick helped her all those years ago, she decides to help them. Michonne disposes of the walker pets and offers her hand to the injured man. The three of them then begin walking to catch up to the larger group.

Season 11

In "On the Inside," Virgil talks about his experiences with Michonne to Connie while trying to convince her to leave him behind.

In "For Blood," Judith asks Virgil what he knows about Michonne's departure. However, Virgil doesn't know the name of the man that Michonne went looking for, but he compares Judith to her adoptive mother.

In the series finale, over a year after Michonne's departure to find Rick, she continues her search, although she appears to have parted ways with the group of survivors that she had encountered and resumed her journey alone on horseback. At the same time, Judith finally reveals the truth about Michonne's departure and Rick's survival to her friends. Setting out to search for other survivors, Daryl promises Judith that he will also try to find Rick and Michonne and bring them home.

Untitled Rick & Michonne spin-off 

Michonne is set to return in an untitled spin-off series continuing her search for Rick.

Reception 
Michonne was voted #86 on IGN's Top 100 Comic Book Heroes. Regarding the television portrayal of the character, her scowling expression, reserved nature, and "Magical Negro" qualities have been much-discussed by reviewers. Michonne's uniquely independent nature has been praised, with one website commenting, "A case could be made that no character is as independently strong as Michonne." However, others have criticized Michonne's lack of development on the show, writing that she "was quickly sinking into the "strong black woman" trope. She is constantly assaulted and manhandled with seemingly very little concern shown for her wellbeing."

Noel Murray of Rolling Stone ranked Michonne number one in a list of 30 best Walking Dead characters, saying, "She survived on her own for months, figuring out how to thrive in the wilderness under the harshest of circumstances. Yet she's also adapted well to living in a group, and has even started to draw on her pre-apocalypse past as a mother and an academic to start thinking about how best to rebuild society. Savage when she has to be, tender and affectionate with her friends and lovers, both nurturing and deadly as they come, this character (courtesy of Danai Gurira's continually extraordinary performance) represents this series at its best. Michonne hasn't lost touch with her humanity. And she's a thrill to watch on a killing spree."

References 

Characters created by Robert Kirkman
Comics characters introduced in 2005
Fictional African-American people
Fictional female swordfighters
Fictional kenjutsuka
Fictional sole survivors
Fictional swordfighters in comics
Fictional torturers
Fictional women soldiers and warriors
Fictional zombie hunters
Image Comics female characters
The Walking Dead (franchise) characters
American female characters in television